Michael J. Touhey (1844 - March 22, 1904) was a member of the Wisconsin State Assembly.

Biography
Touhey was born on November 30, 1844 in County Clare, Ireland and emigrated to the United States in 1847. His family settled in Manitowoc County, Wisconsin and, in 1868, in Brown County, Wisconsin where Touhey was engaged in farming and took an active interest in public affairs.

Career
Touhey was twice elected to represent his district in the Wisconsin state legislature, including in 1877. Other positions he held included member of the Town Board (similar to a city council) of Morrison, Wisconsin. Touhey was a Democrat.

Touhey died at the age of 60 on March 22, 1904 in Bessemer, Michigan, where he had been living for the previous 18 years, leaving a widow and 8 children.

References

Politicians from County Clare
Irish emigrants to the United States (before 1923)
People from Manitowoc County, Wisconsin
People from Morrison, Wisconsin
Wisconsin city council members
1844 births
1904 deaths
Democratic Party members of the Wisconsin State Assembly